The Coroner's Court for the City of Westminster, Greater London, is located in Westminster at 65, Horseferry Road, together with the office of HM Coroner, and is a Grade II listed building.

The Court covers part of the Inner West London coroner area, together with the Inner West London Coroner's Court, which is located on Tachbrook Street; there are four London boroughs within its coronial jurisdiction, as it serves Westminster and the Boroughs of Kensington and Chelsea, Wandsworth, and Merton. HM Senior Coroner for the Coronial Area of Inner West London fulfils the duties of that office from both locations.

References 

City of Westminster
Coroner's courts in London